Mafalda Piovano de Castro was an Argentine politician. She was elected to the Chamber of Deputies in 1951 as one of the first group of female parliamentarians in Argentina.

Biography
In the 1951 legislative elections she was a Peronist Party candidate in Santiago del Estero and was one of the 26 women elected to the Chamber of Deputies. She remained in office until 1955, when her term was cut short by the Revolución Libertadora.

References

Justicialist Party politicians
Members of the Argentine Chamber of Deputies elected in Santiago del Estero
Women members of the Argentine Chamber of Deputies
Year of birth missing
Possibly living people
20th-century Argentine politicians
20th-century Argentine women politicians